The 2019 Première ligue de soccer du Québec season was the eighth season of play for the Première ligue de soccer du Québec, a Division 3 semi-professional soccer league in the Canadian soccer pyramid and the highest level of soccer based in the Canadian province of Québec.

A.S. Blainville was the defending champion for the men's division from 2018 and once again won the title for the third consecutive season.

Changes from 2018 
For the first time, the league will have nine teams in the men's division. CS Monteuil will begin their first season in the league, after previously having a female team the prior year.

Teams 
The following nine teams will take part in the 2019 season:

Standings

Top scorers

Awards

League Cup 
The cup tournament is a separate contest from the rest of the season, in which all nine teams from the league take part, and is unrelated to the season standings.  It is not a form of playoffs at the end of the season (as is typically seen in North American sports), but is a competition running in parallel to the regular season (similar to the Canadian Championship or the FA Cup), albeit only for PLSQ teams.  All matches are separate from the regular season, and are not reflected in the season standings.

In a change from previous seasons, it will begin with a group stage featuring three group of three teams each.  The top team in each group, as well as the best second place finisher will advance to the knockout round.

Group stage 
Group A

Group B

Group C

Knockout Round

Reserve Division
The league operated a reserve division.

Awards

References

PLSQ
Première ligue de soccer du Québec seasons